The Ponte dei Trepponti or Trepponti bridge is a masonry arch bridge in Comacchio, Italy. It spans the Palotta canal, which splits up underneath it. The Trepponti bridge is a rare example of a five-way multi-way bridge.

Description
The name Trepponti, originating from the word tre (three) and ponti (bridge) refers to the split in the canal underneath the bridge - however, technically speaking the Trepponti bridge consists of not three but five stone arch bridges, as the Sant'Agostino and San Petro canals that made up the old Comacchio moat also intersect the canal here. The five bridges are connected by a central Istrian stone floor that makes up a small pentagonally-shaped public square, held up by a cross-vaulted ceiling. Five large staircases connect the bridge to the city streets and the fish market below. Two guard towers stand over the bridge's southeastern side. Several columns serve a decorative purpose.

On the rightmost tower is a plaque that contains a passage from the Italian poet Torquato Tasso that references Comacchio:

History 
In the 16th century, Comacchio was ruled by the Papal States. Cardinal Giovan Battista Pallotta commissioned the Trepponti bridge as part of the city's renovation, and Capuchin Giovanni Pietro da Lugano constructed it. Comachio had been raided by assailants in the past decades and was left in disrepair. Ravennese architect Luca Danese was tasked with drafting the city's renovation plans and designed the Trepponti bridge as part of its new defensive works. The Trepponti bridge would be one of the city's main gates as well as the entryway into its internal canal network. It was completed in 1638. 

Upon initial construction, the Trepponti bridge did not yet have its distinctive guard towers: they were added in 1695 to reinforce the defensive parapets, under the rule of Cardinal Giuseppe Renato Imperiali. During his rule, the side walls of the staircase were also raised for defensive purposes. A fish market was created at the city gate at some later point in time. In 1823, the parapets were removed and replaced by decorative columns under the guidance of Ferraran engineer Giovanni Tosi.

References

Pedestrian bridges in Italy
Three-way bridges
Buildings and structures completed in 1638